Genealogies of Kedah Rulers can be found in two traditional Malay texts, the first one being Hikayat Merong Mahawangsa, a chronicle written in the late 16th century, and the other is Al-Tarikh Salasilah Kedah ('genealogies of Kedah'), a royal-sanctioned history published in 1928. The records however do not provide consistent genealogies for the early Rulers of Kedah. According to the Hikayat, Kedah's first Ruler was Merong Mahawangsa. In the Salasilah, it is stated that the first Kedah Ruler was Derbar Raja I who originated from Persia in the 9th century CE.

Nevertheless, the Hikayat and Salasilah do share some similarities, the most important is that both texts state that the first converted Ruler to Islam took the name Sultan Muzaffar Shah, although the original name of the Ruler is different. Hikayat mentions that Raja Phra Ong Mahawangsa was the first to convert to Islam, while in the Salasilah, it is stated it was Derbar Raja II. The following family tree is based on the royal-sanctioned Salasilah. The beginning of Sultan Mudzaffar Shah I's reign is typically dated to 1136 in Kedah tradition.

References

Bibliography
 
 .

Kedah